The following is a list of the MTV Europe Music Award winners and nominees for Best Latin America Central Act. This category was almost always won by Colombia, except in 2013 by Anna Carina from Peru, and in 2022 by Danny Ocean from Venezuela.

Winners and nominees

2010s

2020s

References

See also 
 MTV Video Music Award for Best Latin Artist
 MTV VMA International Viewer's Choice Award for MTV Latin America
 MTV VMA International Viewer's Choice Award for MTV Internacional
 Los Premios MTV Latinoamérica
 Los Premios MTV Latinoamérica for Best Artist — Central

MTV Europe Music Awards
Colombian music
Venezuelan music
Peruvian music
Chilean music
Awards established in 2012